Ittibittium houbricki is a species of sea snail, a marine gastropod mollusk in the family Cerithiidae.

Description

Distribution
This marine species occurs off Western Australia.

References

 Ponder, W., 1993. A new cerithiid from south Western Australia (Mollusca: Gastropoda: Caenogastropoda: Cerithiidae). Proceedings of the Third International Marine Biological Workshop 1: 267–277

Cerithiidae
Gastropods described in 1993